The action of 1 May 1781 was a naval engagement nearly 210 miles off the Port of Brest in which , a 74-gun third rate of the Royal Navy under Captain George Collier chased, intercepted and captured the 40-gun Spanish frigate Santa Leocadia, captained by Don Francisco Wenthuisen.

Battle
On 30 April, the 74-gun ship HMS Canada, Captain Sir George Collier, having been detached by Vice-Admiral George Darby, commander-in-chief of the Channel Fleet, to watch the port of Brest, discovered a squadron of small ships. The squadron dispersed on her approach, upon which Canada chased the largest, the Santa Leocadia.

After a running fight, which lasted up to an hour and a half, and in heavy seas which prevented the Canada from opening her lower deck ports, the frigate surrendered. She had suffered heavy casualties, with 80 men killed and 106 wounded (nearly half her complement), including her captain, Don Francisco Wenthuisen, who lost an arm. The Canada had one of the trunnions of a lower deck gun shot off and suffered ten casualties.

What was remarkable about Santa Leocadia is that she was noted before the battle as being a remarkably fast-sailing ship. The discovery that she was coppered when she was captured came in some ways as a surprise. It was now known to the British Admiralty that other navies had decided to copper their ships as well as the Royal Navy. The Santa Leocadia was the first in the Spanish service that was coppered, and she was added to the British navy under the same name.

References 
Citations

Bibliography

Allen, Joseph, Battles of the British navy, Volume 1  H. G. Bohn London,(1852)
External links
 3Decks - Santa-Leocadia 

Conflicts in 1781
Naval battles of the American Revolutionary War involving Spain
Naval battles of the American Revolutionary War
Naval battles of the Anglo-Spanish War (1779–1783)